Anibal Zahle is a Lebanese sports club most known for its basketball program that played in first division basketball for many years since 1950. It is located Zahlé, Lebanon, which is a Lebanese sports club most known for its basketball program that played in first division basketball for many years. Its women basketball team presently plays in top division for women.

Its name is derived from Hannibal, the famous Carthaginian military commander and tactician. Anibal Zahle basketball team was part of the Lebanese Basketball League A division .

The club finished 7th in the 2009–2010 FLB regular season and failed to advance to the final 6 round. In 2011–2012 season, Anibal finished 2nd in the league and won the Lebanese Cup and Dubai International Basketball Championship. In 2012–2013 season, Anibal was relegated to Division 2 and finished 10th. In 2013–2014 season, Anibal was relegated to Division 3. In 2018–2019 season, Anibal won the second division title and are back in the first division starting 2019–2020 season.

Squad

Achievements

 Lebanese Cup Winner (1): 2012

 Dubai International Basketball Tournament (1): 2012

 Lebanese Basketball League Second Division (1) : 2019

Basketball teams in Lebanon
Basketball teams established in 1958
1958 establishments in Lebanon